This is a complete list of the 320 blue plaques placed by English Heritage and its predecessors in the City of Westminster in London.

List

|}

See also
List of English Heritage blue plaques in Camden
List of English Heritage blue plaques in Kensington and Chelsea

References

External links

City of Westminster-related lists
English Heritage
Lists of buildings and structures in London
Westminster